The Dining Rooms is a band based in Milan, Italy which combines ambient and electronic music, described as downbeat. The band consists of Stefano Ghittoni and Cesare Malfatti.

Recent releases
In autumn 2008 "Other Ink" was released - this is the remix version of "Ink" and remixers involved are The Cinematic Orchestra, Populous, Christian Prommer and  Skwerl, among others. The remixes are coupled by a new version of Ink, recorded live at Teatro I during Promise (musical esistenzialista), and by "Exit a New York", featuring CharlElie Couture and originally released only for the French market.

In the spring of 2009, to celebrate ten years of The Dining Rooms, Schema Records releases "Christian Prommer's Drumlesson plays The Dining Rooms: The Jazz Thing", containing songs such as Hear us Now, Dreamy Smiles, M. Dupont, Thin Ice, Prigionieri del Deserto, Thank You?, Destination Moon, No Problem, Tunnel, Milano Calibro 9, Afrolicious, Ink and Pure and Easy.

Discography
 Subterranean Modern, Vol. 1 1999
 Remixes 2000
 Numero Deux 2001
 Tre 2003
 Versioni Particolari 2004
 Experiments in Ambient Soul 2005
 Versioni Particolari 2 2006
 Ink 2007
 If I could EP (2007)
 Other Ink 2008
 Christian Prommer's Drumlesson plays The Dining Rooms 2009
 Lonesome Traveller 2011
 Do Hipsters Love Sun (Ra)? (2015)
 Art is a Cat (2020)

References

External links
 – official site

Schema Records artists
Acid jazz ensembles
Italian electronic music groups
Musical groups from Milan